Anser Farooq is a Canadian defence attorney based in Mississauga, Ontario, who gained notability defending suspects during the 2006 Ontario terrorism plot.

Notable Clients
Farooq represented two members of the 2006 Ontario terrorism plot: Ibrahim Aboud, and Qayyum Jamal. Aboud and Jamal had their charges stayed in April 2008.

In 2007, he represented Ayad Mejid, a Muslim preacher who was suspected of using child pornography. In 2010, charges were dismissed after a judge found that Mejid's rights were violated when he was forced to turn over his computer to investigators. In April 2011, Majid filed a lawsuit for $10,000,000.00 against the government, where he was again represented by Farooq.

Farooq was also counsel for Khurram Sher, who was alleged to have participated in an Ottawa terrorism plot. Sher had auditioned for Canadian Idol. On October 13, 2010, Sher was released on bail. Sher was represented by Michael Edelson at trial, where he was acquitted.

Farooq was counsel for Mohamed Hersi, who was arrested on March 31, 2011 at Toronto Pearson International Airport and was alleged to have attempted to join Al-Shabaab. After a two-day hearing Hersi was released on bail April 29, 2011. Hersi changed counsel and was represented by Paul Salansky at trial. He was convicted of the charges and sentenced to 10 years in prison.

Farooq also sued the CBSA for defamation on behalf of his client, Mr. Noori, and demanded that the Canada-wide arrest warrant issued pursuant to the IRPA be rescinded. CBSA placed Mr. Noori on the wanted list for crimes against humanity and war crime - however, following the claim the CBSA removed Mr. Noori from their web site.  

Farooq also was counsel for Jahanzeb Malik, who Canada deported to Pakistan while accusing Malik of plotting mayhem in the heart of Toronto. Farooq called the plan to deport "absurd".

Farooq also represented Mohammed El Shaer of Windsor who travelled to Middle East and was arrested on a terrorism peace bond. 

Farooq also represented Mr. Abdul who entered into a peace bond following allegations of participation on terrorist group.

References

External links
Corporate website

Canadian lawyers
2006 Ontario terrorism plot
Living people
People from Mississauga
Year of birth missing (living people)